The Christmas Spirit is the first Christmas album and seventeenth album by country singer Johnny Cash, released on Columbia Records in November 1963. It contains four original Christmas songs written by Cash and eight tracks originally penned by other artists, including "Blue Christmas" (at this point best known through the version recorded by Cash's former Sun Records labelmate Elvis Presley), "Silent Night" and "Little Drummer Boy".

Track listing

Personnel
 Johnny Cash - vocals, guitar
 Luther Perkins, Grady Martin, Jack Clement - guitar
 Marshall Grant - bass
 W.S. Holland, Buddy Harman - drums
 Hargus "Pig" Robbins, Bill Pursell - organ, piano
 Maybelle Carter - autoharp
 Anita Kerr - organ
 Bob Johnson - flute

Charts
Album - Billboard (United States)

Singles - Billboard (United States)

External links
 Luma Electronic entry on The Christmas Spirit

Johnny Cash albums
1963 Christmas albums
Christmas albums by American artists
Columbia Records Christmas albums
Country Christmas albums